The first season of the long-running Australian medical drama All Saints began airing on 24 February 1998 and concluded on 17 November 1998 with a total of 41 episodes.

Cast and characters

Regular
Georgie Parker as Terri Sullivan
Jeremy Cumpston as Connor Costello
Sam Healy as Jaz Hillerman
Martin Lynes as Luke Forlano
Judith McGrath as Von Ryan
Andrew McKaige as Peter Morrison
Libby Tanner as Bronwyn Craig
Ben Tari as Jared Levine
Kirrily White as Stephanie Markham

Semi-Regular
Brian Vriends as Ben Markham (29 episodes)
Elizabeth Maywald as Sophie Williams (17 episodes)
Justine Clarke as Samantha O'Hara (8 episodes)

Recurring
Steve Jacobs as Harry Williams (2 episodes)

Guest
Kim Hillas as Joan Marden (5 episodes)
Michael Caton as Bob Parkin (7 episodes)

Maggie Dence, Kym Wilson, Bridie Carter, Peter Gwynne, June Salter, Matt Doran, Linda Hartley, Max Phipps, Rod Mullinar, Virginia Hey, Joyce Jacobs, Betty Bobbitt, Charles "Bud" Tingwell, Anna Hruby, and John Walton.

Episodes

DVD release

References

External links 
 
 List of All Saints season 1 episodes at the Australian Television Information Archive

All Saints (TV series) seasons
1998 Australian television seasons